Nathaniel Woodhull "Nat" Hicks (April 19, 1845 – April 21, 1907) was an American professional baseball player. He played as a catcher in Major League Baseball for six seasons, two in the National League. Hicks was one of the first catchers to stand directly behind the batter, which allowed future Hall of Fame pitcher, Candy Cummings to develop the first curveball used in baseball. Hicks was a popular and highly regarded player during his time in baseball, but injuries sustained over the course of his career cut his playing time short.

Early life
Nat Hicks was born in Hempstead, New York into the famous Hicks family. His father was Jackson Hicks (1811- ), and his mother, Sarah Sweet (1817- ). The family moved to Newtown Queens circa 1850 where his siblings were born: brother Barnett (1852-) and a sister Delia (1855-).  His paternal grandparents were Jeffery Hicks (1778-1829) and Mary Polly Hicks (1784-1854). His patrilineal great-grandparents were Jeffrey Hicks (1739 - 1790) who had been born in Flushing, and Mary Cornell (1745 - 1792).

Hick's relatives included famous Quaker and abolitionist Elias Hicks also of Hempstead, and Elias' son Valentine Hicks, who first settled the community of Hicksville, Long Island, and was later president of the Long Island Rail Road.  He was also a distant cousin of Quaker and painter Edward Hicks.  He is related Isaac Hicks, who founded Hicks Nursery in 1852.

Hicks served briefly in the 15th New York Infantry Regiment near the end of the American Civil War.

Career
He began playing professional baseball in the National Association of Base Ball Players through , most notably for the Eckford of Brooklyn. Hicks' pivotal role in the development of the curveball is seldom mentioned. Most catchers of his era stood twenty to twenty-five feet behind the batter, which made it impossible to field a curveball. It was Hicks' catching technique of standing directly behind the batter, that allowed Cummings to introduce his curveball. The introduction of the curveball not only caused a revolutionary change in the way catchers fielded their position, but also radically changed pitching as well.

He later moved on and spent most of his career playing in the National Association. He joined the New York Mutuals in  where he was reunited with Cummings, and became their everyday catcher. He batted .306 that season as the Mutuals finished third. He played in only 28 games and shared the catching duties that season with Dick Higham and Doug Allison.

On July 24, 1873, Bob Ferguson of the Brooklyn Atlantics was the umpire in a game between the New York Mutuals and the Baltimore Canaries which ended with the Mutuals scoring 3 runs in the bottom of the 9th inning for an 11-10 victory. Ferguson and the Mutuals' Hicks got into a verbal altercation which ended with Ferguson breaking Hicks' arm by hitting him with a bat. Ferguson required a police escort to leave the field and Hicks was out of action for 2 months.

He returned to the Mutuals in  when he was named the player-manager, the only stint as a manager in his career. There is some dispute with this notion, as other baseball references have him as player-manager for the White Stockings the previous year as well, instead of Bill Craver.

Personal life
In 1873, Hicks married Margaret Mehan, the daughter of Irish immigrants, with whom he had ten children.  They married in Hoboken, New Jersey, and they are interred together at St. Peter's Catholic Cemetery.

Post-career
After his baseball days were over, he became a professional singer and proprietor of a billiard academy. While Cummings went on to become enshrined in the Baseball Hall of Fame, Hicks' role in the development of the curveball is rarely mentioned. Hicks died in Hoboken, New Jersey at the age of 62 of accidental gas asphyxiation in a hotel room, and was interred in St. Peter's Cemetery in Jersey City, New Jersey.

See also
Denny Mack – the Radcliffe affair

References

External links

Major League Baseball catchers
Baseball player-managers
Brooklyn Stars players
Washington Nationals (NABBP) players
New York Mutuals players
New York Mutuals managers
Philadelphia White Stockings players
Cincinnati Reds (1876–1879) players
People from Hempstead (village), New York
Baseball players from New York (state)
Accidental deaths in New Jersey
Deaths from asphyxiation
19th-century baseball players
People of New York (state) in the American Civil War
1845 births
1907 deaths